The historical novel Gildenford (1977) by Valerie Anand opens in 1036, with the "brutal massacre" of Alfred Aetheling and his followers by Harold Harefoot. The novel then focuses on the effects of the event over the following decades. Events are seen from the perspective of Brand Woodcutter, a fictional retainer of Godwin, Earl of Wessex.

References

Cultural depictions of English kings
Cultural depictions of Danish kings